Yao Fuqiang (born May 1957) is a Chinese scientist specializing in communications system. He is an academician of the Chinese Academy of Engineering (CAE) and holds the rank of major general (shaojiang) in the People's Liberation Army. He is a member of the Chinese Institute of Electronics (CIE) and China Institute of Communications (CIC).

Biography
Yao was born in Zongyang County, Anhui, in May 1957. He secondary studied at Tietong Agricultural High School. He earned a bachelor's degree in 1982, a master's degree in 1990, and a doctor's degree in 1993, all from Xidian University. He is now a researcher, doctoral supervisor, and director of the No.63 Research Institute of National University of Defense Technology. He is a part-time professor at Tsinghua University, Beijing Institute of Technology, and Harbin Institute of Technology.

Honours and awards
 November 22, 2019 Member of the Chinese Academy of Engineering (CAE)

References

1957 births
Living people
People from Zongyang County
Scientists from Anhui
Xidian University alumni
Academic staff of the National University of Defense Technology
Members of the Chinese Academy of Engineering